The second season of the Australian Dancing with the Stars TV series premiered on Tuesday 8 February 2005 and concluded on Tuesday 26 April 2005. The Great Outdoors presenter Tom Williams and his partner Kym Johnson won the series, defeating NRL star Ian Roberts and his partner, Natalie Lowe.

Couples

The second season of the  Australian Dancing with the Stars TV series premiered on Tuesday 8 February 2005 and concluded on Tuesday 26 April 2005. It featured the following celebrities.

Scoring chart
Red numbers indicate the couples with the lowest score for each week.
Green numbers indicate the couples with the highest score for each week.
 indicates the couple (or couples) eliminated that week.
 indicates the returning couple that finished in the bottom two.
 indicates the winning couple.
 indicates the runner-up couple.
 indicates the third-place couple.

Dance schedule
The celebrities and professional partners will dance one of these routines for each corresponding week.

Week 1 : Cha-cha-cha or Waltz
Week 2 : Quickstep or Rumba
Week 3 : Tango or Jive
Week 4 : Paso doble or Foxtrot
Week 5 : Samba
Week 6 : One unlearned Ballroom or Latin dance from weeks 1-5
Week 7 : One unlearned Ballroom or Latin dance from weeks 1-6
Week 8 : One unlearned Ballroom or Latin dance from weeks 1-7 + Group Viennese Waltz
Week 9 : Final unlearned Ballroom or Latin dance from weeks 1-8 & Favourite Dance of Season
Week 10 : Two Favourite Dances of the Season & Freestyle

Dance chart

 Highest Scoring Dance
 Lowest Scoring Dance

Average chart

The average chart is based on the dances performed by the celebrities and not their place in the competition.

Highest and lowest scoring performances
The best and worst performances in each dance according to the judges' 40-point scale are as follows (guest judges scores are excluded):

Couples' highest and lowest scoring dances
Scores are based upon a 40-point maximum:

Weekly scores

Week 1 
Individual judges scores in the chart below (given in parentheses) are listed in this order from left to right: Todd, Helen, Paul, Mark.

Running order

Week 2
Musical guests: 
Running order

Week 3
Musical guests: 
Running order

Week 4
Musical guests: 
Running order

Week 5
Musical guests: 
Running order

Week 6
Musical guests: 
Running order

Week 7
Musical guests: 
Running order

Week 8
Musical guests: 
Running order

Week 9
Musical guests: 
Running order

Week 10
Musical guests: Anthony Callea
Running order

References

Season 02
2005 Australian television seasons